Lilian Castro (born 19 December 1986) is a Salvadoran sports shooter. She competed in the women's 10 metre air pistol event at the 2016 Summer Olympics. She finished 44th in the qualifying round, and therefore did not qualify for the finals. Castro was the flag bearer for El Salvador in the Parade of Nations.

References

External links
 

1986 births
Living people
Salvadoran female sport shooters
Olympic shooters of El Salvador
Shooters at the 2016 Summer Olympics
Place of birth missing (living people)
Shooters at the 2011 Pan American Games
Shooters at the 2015 Pan American Games
Pan American Games medalists in shooting
Pan American Games bronze medalists for El Salvador
Medalists at the 2015 Pan American Games
21st-century Salvadoran women